The Tanduay Light Rhum Masters are a basketball team playing in the PBA Developmental League. The team is owned by Tanduay Distillers, Inc. and was originally known as the Boracay Rum Waves (2012-2014), which succeeded the Cobra Energy Drink Iron Men (2009-2012).

Notable roster

See also
Cobra Energy Drink Iron Men (PBL, PBA D-League)
Tanduay Rhum Masters (PBA)
Stag Pale Pilseners (PBL)
Manila Beer Brewmasters (PBA)

References

PBA Developmental League teams